Piotr Stańczak (c. 1966 – 7 February 2009) was a Polish geologist who was beheaded by Islamic terrorists in Pakistan in February 2009.

Abduction
Stańczak was abducted in the city of Attock in September 2008 after gunmen shot dead his driver, translator and bodyguard with whom he was travelling in a car. His murderers said they murdered him because the Pakistani government failed to release Taliban prisoners. Officials at the Polish Embassy in Islamabad saw the video of the murder and confirmed that the person who was murdered was Piotr Stańczak.

Murder
The taped murder was reminiscent of the beheading in 2002 of Daniel Pearl, at that time the last Westerner to be murdered on video in Pakistan. Stańczak was allegedly offered the opportunity to avoid death by converting to Islam. When Stańczak refused, he was forced to read statements before his murder. The video shows Stańczak asking the Polish government not to send troops to Afghanistan, which later leads to the masked men cutting off Stańczak's head.

Aftermath
Stańczak's body was later recovered outside a paramilitary camp in Razmak and returned to Poland aboard a Pakistani Air Force plane. A brief ceremony was held on the tarmac.

The Polish government issued international arrest warrants for the murderers, in addition to offering a 1 million złoty (about $290,000 USD) reward for information that would lead to the arrest of the suspects. Warsaw also "categorically demands from Pakistan's authorities the capture of the culprits of this crime and their punishment with the full severity this act demands", according to a statement released by the Polish Foreign Ministry. Poland requested help from the United States in their efforts to catch the killers.

On July 25, 2009, Pakistani police arrested a former parliamentarian with close links to the Taliban, Shah Abdul Aziz, in connection with the murder of Stańczak. A captured member of the Taliban told an anti-terrorism court that he was given orders by Aziz to kill Stańczak.

On September 30, 2010, the President of Poland posthumously awarded him the Officer's Cross of the Order of Polonia Restituta.

In November 2017 another Al Qaeda commander responsible for multiple kidnappings, including Stańczak, was arrested in Afghanistan.

See also

 Foreign hostages in Afghanistan
 Nick Berg
 Paul Marshall Johnson Jr.
 Eugene Armstrong
 Kim Sun-il
 Kenneth Bigley
 Shosei Koda
 Margaret Hassan
 Seif Adnan Kanaan

References

Terrorism deaths in Pakistan
Foreign hostages in Pakistan
Pakistan–Poland relations
2009 deaths
20th-century Polish geologists
1960s births
People from Krosno County
Polish expatriates in Pakistan
Filmed executions in Pakistan
Executed Polish people
Polish terrorism victims
21st-century Polish geologists
People murdered in Pakistan
Polish people murdered abroad
People executed for refusing to convert to Islam
Islamism-related beheadings